The International Contemporary Ensemble (ICE) is a contemporary classical music ensemble, based in New York City and Chicago. ICE performs a diverse and extensive array of chamber, electro-acoustic, improvisatory, and multimedia works.

History

The International Contemporary Ensemble was founded in 2001 by Claire Chase (Ensemble flautist and executive director). The early ensemble—consisting primarily of alumni from the Oberlin Conservatory in Ohio—presented its first Chicago concert at the Three Arts Club in January 2002. In the following year, the Ensemble made its New York City debut at the Miller Theatre, and have since split their activities between Chicago and New York.

Since its founding, the Ensemble has premiered over 500 compositions, many of these commissions and collaborations spawning from their noteworthy residency programs: the 21st Century Young Composers Project and ICElab. In addition to commissioning emerging composers, the ensemble has also premiered numerous works by world-renowned composers, including Georges Aperghis, Alvin Lucier, Pauline Oliveros, John Zorn, David Lang, Liza Lim, Dai Fujikura, Chaya Czernowin, Julio Estrada, Amir Shpilman, George E. Lewis,  Anna Thorvaldsdottir, and Carla Kihlstedt, among others.

The International Contemporary Ensemble has performed at the Lincoln Center Festival (New York), Musica Nova Helsinki (Finland), Wien Modern (Austria), Acht Brücken Music for Cologne (Germany), La Cité de la Musique (Paris), the Darmstädter Ferienkurse (Germany), Mostly Mozart Festival (New York), as well as tours of Japan, Brazil and France. They have held residencies at the Museum of Contemporary Art Chicago, Mostly Mozart Festival, New York University, Columbia College (Chicago), and Conservatorio de las Rosas (Morelia, Mexico), among others.

Members

ICE is a flexible collective of thirty-four performing artists, including strings, woodwinds, piano, percussion, voice, light and sound designers. As an artist-run organization, most of ICE’s executive leadership, concert production, marketing, fundraising, technology and database systems are managed by members of the ensemble.

Discography

 Abandoned Time Daniel Lippel (New Focus Recordings, 2008)
 Afterglow composer Keeril Makan (Mode, 2013)

With John Zorn
On the Torment of Saints, the Casting of Spells and the Evocation of Spirits (Tzadik, 2013)

With John Adams
 Son Of Chamber Symphony / String Quartet St. Lawrence String Quartet (Nonesuch, 2011)

References

External links 
International Contemporary Ensemble Official website
digitICE ICE's digital media library
ICE press ICE's press database: articles, interviews, and reviews

Contemporary classical music ensembles